Skallelv Chapel is a chapel in Vadsø Municipality in Troms og Finnmark county, Norway. It is located in the village of Skallelv. It is an annex chapel for the Vadsø parish which is part of the Varanger prosti (deanery) in the Diocese of Nord-Hålogaland. The yellow, wooden church was built in a long church style in 1961 by the architect Rolf Harlew Jenssen. The church seats about 78 people. The chapel does not hold regular services other than during the major church holidays and special events.

See also
List of churches in Nord-Hålogaland

References

Vadsø
Churches in Finnmark
Wooden churches in Norway
20th-century Church of Norway church buildings
Churches completed in 1960
1961 establishments in Norway
Long churches in Norway